Owen Cunningham (born 23 January 1967), nicknamed OJ, is an Australian former rugby league footballer who played in the 1980s, 1990s and 2000s. A Queensland State of Origin representative forward, he played his club football for the Manly Warringah Sea Eagles (with whom he won the 1996 premiership), North Queensland Cowboys and the Northern Eagles.

Background
Born in Mackay, Queensland, Cunningham played his junior rugby league for Wests Mackay and attended Mirani State High School before being signed by the Manly Warringah Sea Eagles.

Playing career

Manly Warringah Sea Eagles
In Round 18 of the 1985 NSWRL season, Cunningham made his first grade debut for Manly as an 18-year old against Eastern Suburbs. In 1987, he played in Manly's major semi-final victory over Easts but was not selected in the Grand Final, in which Manly defeated Canberra.

In Round 9 of the 1993 NSWRL season, he played his 100th game in a 12–21 loss to the Canterbury-Bankstown Bulldogs. 

In 1995, Cunningham signed with Super League while in career-best form, which meant he was not eligible for selection in the 1995 State of Origin series. On 24 September 1995, he played in Manly's shock Grand Final loss to the Bulldogs. Manly had finished the season as minor premiers and had only lost two games all year, where as Canterbury had finished in 6th and needed to win three sudden death matches just to reach the decider. 

In 1996, Cunningham made his State of Origin debut for Queensland, coming off the bench in their Game III loss to New South Wales.

North Queensland Cowboys
In 1997, Cunningham returned to Queensland, joining the North Queensland Cowboys, winning the club's Player of the Year award. That season, he also represented Queensland in the Super League Tri-series. In Round 16 of the 1997 season he played his 200th game in a 14–22 loss to the Canberra Raiders.

In 1998, he played 23 games for the club, captaining the side in their 16–50 loss to the Sydney City Roosters.

Manly Warringah Sea Eagle (second stint)
In 1999, Cunningham re-joined Manly for their then final season as a stand-alone club, playing all 24 of their games. In Round 26 of the 1999 NRL season, he played in what was the club's last game, a 18–20 loss to the St George-Illawarra Dragons at WIN Stadium.

Northern Eagles
Following the conclusion of the 1999 season, Manly were forced to merge with arch-rivals North Sydney, forming the Northern Eagles. Cunningham was one of the players selected to be a part of the new side, playing 26 games in the 2000 NRL season. In Round 1 of the 2000 season, he played his 250th game in the Eagles' 24–14 win over the Newcastle Knights. He retired at the end of the season, with his final game a 22-32 loss to the Auckland Warriors at Mt Smart Stadium.

Achievements and accolades

Individual
North Queensland Cowboys Player of the Year: 1997

Statistics

NSWRL/ARL/Super League/NRL

State of Origin

Post-playing career
Upon retirement, Cunningham returned to Mackay and coached the Mackay Sea Eagles Foley Shield team from 2010 to 2012, winning the competition in 2011.

On May 13 2022, Cunningham was involved in a fight at Suncorp Stadium, during NRL Magic Round. He claimed he was defending his son, who was coward punched by another fan.

References

1967 births
Living people
Australian rugby league players
Queensland Rugby League State of Origin players
Manly Warringah Sea Eagles players
Manly Warringah Sea Eagles captains
North Queensland Cowboys players
Northern Eagles players
Rugby league players from Mackay, Queensland
Rugby league props